Pedro Herrera III (born August 23, 1979 in Houston, Texas), better known by his stage name Chingo Bling, is an American rapper, producer, and comedian of Mexican descent.

Early life and education
Chingo attended Peddie School, a private college preparatory boarding school in Hightstown, New Jersey, on a scholarship. Chingo graduated from Trinity University in San Antonio, Texas with a bachelor's degree in Marketing in 2001. He now lives in Houston, TX.

Career

Rapping career 

Chingo first gained exposure through his first mixtape release Duro en la pintura and other mixtapes such as The Air Chingo Mixtape and El Mero Chingon, in 2004 through his Independent Record label, Big Chile Enterprises he released his first album The Tamale Kingpin  Featuring hit records like Walk like Cleto and Colombian Pie featuring Mike Jones (rapper) and Paul Wall followed this up by releasing His second album Running 4 President in 2005, his Unique style of music and Great self promotion had major labels wanting to sign him, and in 2006 he signed a Distribution deal with Asylum Records, that same year he released a double disc album named They all want him but who can afford him? which featured artists such as Lucky Luciano (rapper), South Park Mexican, Trae tha Truth, N.O.R.E.,

Finally on August 14, 2007 Chingo released his much anticipated album They Can't Deport Us All through Asylum Records, the album featured artists such as Paul Wall, Lucky Luciano, Stunta, 5th Ward Webbie, Fat Pat, Big Pokey, Baby Bash, Coast and Pitbull.

Comedy career 

He launched a YouTube page and utilized social media as an outlet for his humor.

Chingo Bling's first comedy special, "They Cant Deport Us All" was co-produced with the MiTu network and is now streaming on the Netflix platform.

Controversy
Chingo Bling had been criticized for the title of his second album They Can't Deport Us All.  He was interviewed on CW39 News and said his family's tamale truck has been shot at, vandalized and even, on one occasion, stolen. He also stated he had received racist death threats from White nationalist groups, but still does not intend to change his album's title. Music critics often associated his music with violent street gangs.
Chingo also alleges that he was refused the opportunity to appear at a scheduled in-store album signing at a Dallas shopping mall as a direct result of the controversy surrounding his clothing and album name.  He also asserts that he is the target of numerous Conservative journalists and right wing bloggers who criticize him because of his music and marketing concepts related to immigration.

Prior to the 2020 presidential election, Chingo Bling came out in support of Donald Trump’s re-election, arguing that tighter immigration restrictions would benefit citizens in different ways, including more access to healthcare and jobs.

Discography

Albums
 Duro en la Pintura - Hard in the Paint (2002)
"The Air Chingo Mixtape" (2004)
"El Mero Chingon" (2004)
"The Tamale Kingpin" (2004)
"Chingo Bling 4 President" (2005)
 For President (Skrewed N' Chopped) (2005)
 Undaground's Most Wanted (2006)
 They All Want Him But Who Can Afford Him (2006)
 They Can't Deport Us All (2007)
"Superthrowd" (2008)
"Me Vale Madre" (2009)
"World Star Wetbacks" (2009)
 Tamale Season 2 (2010)
 El Chavo del H (2010)
 The Leak (2011)
 Back To The Border (2011)
 Chingaveli (2011)
 Masahouse (2011)
"Chicken Flippa" (2012)
"Cancun Shawty" (2013)
"Vote 4 pedro" (2014)
"Masahouse 2" (2015)
"Juan Hunna" (2015)
"Dirty Horchata" (2016)
"El Versace Mariachi" (2020)

Comedy Specials 
(2017)

See also 
Houston hip hop
Mexican Americans

References

External links
Chingo Bling Official Homepage
Chingo Bling interview
Official Myspace

American musicians of Mexican descent
Rappers from Houston
Living people
Peddie School alumni
1979 births
21st-century American rappers
Hispanic and Latino American rappers
American male comedians